Michael Harley Jr. (born December 13, 1997) is an American football wide receiver for the Cleveland Browns of the National Football League (NFL). He played college football at Miami (FL).

Professional career
Harley went undrafted in the 2022 NFL draft and signed with the Browns as an undrafted free agent.

Harley signed a reserve/future contract with the Browns on January 9, 2023.

References

1997 births
Living people
American football wide receivers
Cleveland Browns players
Miami Hurricanes football players
Players of American football from Fort Lauderdale, Florida
St. Thomas Aquinas High School (Florida) alumni